Fuente y caudal (translated in English as Source and Flow) is the ninth studio album by the Spanish composer and guitarist Paco de Lucía.

Track listing
All pieces are credited to Paco de Lucía and José Torregrosa.

"Entre dos aguas" (Rumba) – 5:59
"Aires choqueros" (Fandangos de Huelva) – 4:14
"Reflejo de luna" (Granaína) – 3:53
"Solera" (Bulerías por Soleá) – 3:41
"Fuente y caudal" (Taranta) – 5:13
"Cepa Andaluza" (Bulería) – 5:46
"Los Pinares" (Tangos) – 3:33
"Plaza de San Juan" (Alegrías) – 3:12

Personnel
 Paco de Lucía - Flamenco guitar
 Ramón de Algeciras - Flamenco guitar

References
 Gamboa, Manuel José and Nuñez, Faustino. (2003). Paco de Lucía. Madrid:Universal Music Spain.

1973 albums
Paco de Lucía albums